Uppala-Bayar-Kanyana road  is the highway connecting Uppala with Bekoor, Kubanoor, Paivalike, Bayar and leads to Kanyana, Vittal and Puttur in Dakshina kannada district, Karnataka.

Roads in Kasaragod district